Ilya Arnoldovich Ilf (born Iehiel-Leyb Aryevich Faynzilberg) ( in Odesa – 13 April 1937, Moscow), was a popular Soviet journalist and writer of Jewish origin who usually worked in collaboration with Yevgeni Petrov during the 1920s and 1930s. Their duo was known simply as Ilf and Petrov. Together they published two popular comedy novels The Twelve Chairs (1928) and The Little Golden Calf (1931), as well as a satirical book Odnoetazhnaya Amerika (often translated as Little Golden America) that documented their journey through the United States between 1935 and 1936.

Biography

His father was a Jewish bank clerk. He graduated from a technical school in 1913 and held various positions, including time at the telephone company and a military plant. After the Revolution, he began working as a journalist, editing several humor magazines, and joined the Odesa Union of Poets.

In 1923, he relocated to Moscow and took employment at the newspaper  (roughly "Toot!", meaning the locomotive horn noise), a publication for railway workers. His contributions consisted mostly of satirical pieces. It was there that he met his writing partner, Petrov. From 1932 to 1937, they also wrote pieces for major publications such as Pravda, Literaturnaya Gazeta and Krokodil. Ilf also had a passion for photography, but this was not fully appreciated until years after his death, when his daughter discovered his photograph albums.

Illness and death 
Ilf had been diagnosed with tuberculosis in the 1920s. He thought it was in remission, but he was diagnosed with it again during his trip to America, and he died not long after returning. Days later, a Nazi propaganda newspaper, Der Angriff, published an article claiming that Ilf committed suicide following a scathing critique from the Soviet government during a writers' convention. Petrov immediately published a denial in Pravda called "An Answer to Fascist Slanderers", pointing out that his death was caused by illness and that nothing extraordinary happened during the convention, with a full transcript of the proceedings. However, the suicide version is still used by some Western biographers.

Personal life
In 1921 in Odesa, Ilf met the love of his life, Maria Nikolayevna Tarasenko (1904–1981). They married in Moscow in 1924, and had a daughter Aleksandra born in 1935.

Ilf was a passionate photographer. In 1929, Yevgeni Petrov lent him 800 rubles for a camera, and then jokingly regretted that he had lost not only his money but also a friend and co-writer, as Ilf stopped writing and spent most of his time on photography. Long after Ilf's death, his daughter had found and published ca. 200 of his photographs.

References

External links 
 Ilf and Petrov – SovLit.net – Encyclopedia of Soviet Authors
 

1897 births
1937 deaths
Writers from Odesa
People from Kherson Governorate
Ukrainian Jews
Soviet short story writers
20th-century short story writers
Soviet novelists
Soviet male writers
20th-century Russian male writers

20th-century deaths from tuberculosis
Burials at Novodevichy Cemetery
Odesa Jews
Tuberculosis deaths in the Soviet Union
Tuberculosis deaths in Russia